Sufilar may refer to:
 Sufilar, East Azerbaijan